The Light Sniper Rifle (LSR) is a Pakistani 7.62×51mm bolt-action sniper rifle designed and manufactured by the POF. It was displayed on 23 November 2016 along with the HMG PK-16 in the IDEAS Exhibition. It was designed to fulfill the increasing demand of precision rifles in Pakistan.

Characteristics 
The Light Sniper Rifle (LSR) is believed to have been designed to fulfill the demand of an affordable precision rifle platform. The price for one unit is $6500 as of 2016. It is a bolt-action rifle chambered for the 7.62×51mm NATO cartridge and has a weight of 5.68 kg, an effective range of 800 m and Muzzle velocity of 800–820 m/s. It has a Chromium-vanadium steel barrel and is equipped with a quad rail with two forward locking lugs. The rifling has a twist rate of 1:12 and the trigger pull requires 0.5-2.5 kg force. The magazine has a capacity of 5-10 rounds. POF intends to work on extending its range and barrel life after it enters mass-production.

See also

Comparable Sniper rifles 
 Pindad SPR
 Komodo Armament D7CH
 Istiglal anti-materiel rifle
 Yalguzag sniper rifle
 MKEK JNG-90
 T-12 sniper rifle
 Kalekalıp KNT-308
 Siyavash sniper rifle
 Arash (sniper rifle)
 Tabuk Sniper Rifle

Other POF products 
 POF Eye
 HMG PK-16
 Azb sniper rifle
 PSR-90

References 

7.62×51mm NATO rifles
Weapons and ammunition introduced in 2016
Pakistani inventions
Sniper rifles of Pakistan
Bolt-action rifles of Pakistan